Axel Rudi Pell (born 27 June 1960) is a German heavy metal guitarist.

Career
Pell commenced his musical career with Steeler (1984–88) before leaving in 1988 for a solo career. During this time, he has played with such drummers as Jörg Michael and Mike Terrana, and singers Charlie Huhn, Johnny Gioeli of Hardline, Jeff Scott Soto, and Rob Rock. Gioeli remains the longest surviving vocalist of the band, having joined the group since 1998 on the album Oceans of Time, Gioeli's first musical appearance since the 1992 Hardline album Double Eclipse.

Pell often says his music is about a Knight in shining armour going on various adventures. Each album continues one new quest after the other, and songs are told as separate stories. Pell's main influence in guitar work has been Ritchie Blackmore from Deep Purple.

SPV Records released a live DVD on 25 February 2008, titled Live over Europe, which includes the full performance from the Rock Hard Festival in 2007, and comes with a bonus disc which includes live footage from Pell's own archive. In 2012, a new Axel Rudi Pell live concert CD/DVD Live on Fire was released.

In 2013, ex-Rainbow drummer Bobby Rondinelli joined the band, replacing Mike Terrana after his initial departure in 2013. Mike Terrana wanted to pursue other projects, such as becoming a member of the supergroup The Ferrymen, featuring Rainbow singer Ronnie Romero on vocals.
Axel celebrated his 25th anniversary as a musician in 2014, headlining the Bang Your Head festival in Balignen Germany on 11 July 2014. It featured one of the original line up's singers: Jeff Scott Soto. Special guests also included Joerg Michael, Rob Rock, Ronnie Atkins, John Lawton, ex-Rainbow singer Graham Bonnett, Doogie White, keyboardist Tony Carey and drummer Vinny Appice. The show consisted of 3 acts: a short Steeler reunion and brief Axel Rudi Pell original line up reunion with Jeff Scott Soto, a full modern Axel Rudi Pell show with vocalist Johnny Gioeli and current band members, and the last act featuring various Deep Purple and Rainbow covers with a full ensemble.

In 2019, the band celebrated their 30th anniversary, releasing a double live album called XXX – 30th Anniversary Live. The songs were recorded on various dates of the Knights Call 2018 tour. The group's Facebook page stated at the time that the band did not know they were being recorded but when they heard the audio they were amazed and wanted to release it to celebrate the group's 30th Anniversary. It was released in June 2019 on CD and LP.

On 5 February 2020, they announced their latest album on their Facebook page, titled Sign of the Times, due for release on 24 April 2020. In March 2020, the band announced a delay of the release of the new record, due to the ongoing COVID-19 pandemic, and was released on 8 May 2020 instead. A tour in support of the new album was also postponed to 2021 due to the COVID-19 pandemic, and then later delayed again until 2022. In late 2020, Pell announced his newest album Diamonds Unlocked II, which was released on 30 July 2021. It is another covers album similar to Diamonds Unlocked from 2007. Pell is well known for his extensive touring, mostly around Germany and his home town in Bochum. He rarely tours globally, but has performed a few one-off shows in London over the recent years. However, there has always been high demand to bring him to other countries. They are also famous for attending many music festivals such as being regulars at Wacken Open Air since the late 1990s.
Most recently they announced a new album of original music, called Lost XXIII, which is due for release on 15 April 2022.

Band members 

 Current
 Axel Rudi Pell — guitar (1989–present)
Johnny Gioeli — lead vocals (1998–present)
Ferdy Doernberg — keyboards (1997–present)
Volker Krawczak — bass guitar (1989–present)
Bobby Rondinelli — drums (2013–present)

 Past
 Vocals
Charlie Huhn (1989)
Rob Rock (1991)
Jeff Scott Soto (1992–97)

 Bass
Jörg Deisinger (1989)
Thomas Smuszynski (1989)

 Drums
Jörg Michael (1989–98)
Mike Terrana (1998–2013)

 Keyboards
Georg Hahn (1989)
Rüdiger König (1989)
Kai Raglewski (1991–92)
Julie Greaux (1993–96)
Christian Wolff (1997)

 Timeline

Discography

With Steeler 
Steeler (1984)
Rulin' the Earth (1985)
Strike Back (1986)
Undercover Animal (1988)

Solo

Albums 
Wild Obsession (1989)
Nasty Reputation (1991)
Eternal Prisoner (1992)
Between the Walls (1994)
Black Moon Pyramid (1996)
Magic (1997)
Oceans of Time (1998)
The Masquerade Ball (2000)
Shadow Zone (2002)
Kings and Queens (2004)
Mystica (2006)
Diamonds Unlocked (2007) (cover album)
Tales of the Crown (2008)
The Crest (2010)
Circle of the Oath (2012)
Into the Storm (2014)
Game of Sins (2016)
Knights Call (2018)
Sign of the Times (2020)
Diamonds Unlocked II (2021) (cover album)
Lost XXIII (2022)

Compilations 
The Ballads (1993)
The Ballads II (1999)
The Wizard's Chosen Few (2000)
The Ballads III (2004)
The Best of Axel Rudi Pell: Anniversary Edition (2009)
The Ballads IV (2011)
The Ballads V (2017)

Live 
Made in Germany (1995)
Knights Live (2002)
Live on Fire (2013)
Magic Moments: 25th Anniversary Special Show (2015)
XXX Anniversary Live (2019)

DVDs 
Knight Treasures (Live and More) (2002)
Live Over Europe (2008)
One Night Live (2010)
Live on Fire (2013)
Magic Moments 25th Anniversary Special Show (2015)

References

External links 

Axel Rudi Pell on Metal Storm
Axel Rudi Pell, Interview: "I Have Never Changed My Style" September 2011

German heavy metal guitarists
German rock guitarists
German male guitarists
Lead guitarists
1960 births
Living people
People from Bochum